Communist Workers' Party of Bulgaria was a council communist party in the Kingdom of Bulgaria. It was founded in September 1921, and was modelled after the Communist Workers' Party of Germany. It was founded at a conference in the city of Slivnu, a centre of the textile industry, from the 7th until the 10th January 1922. The leadership of the party was based in Varna. The party had around 1000 members, and published Rabotchnik Iskra (Workers' Spark). The party was affiliated to the Communist Workers' International.

The party was divided along the same lines as its German counterpart, with a Sofia-based faction close to the Essen group and the Varna-based faction close to the Berlin group. The party was disbanded as a result of repression in April 1925.

See also 

 Council communism
 Left communism
 Communist Workers' Party of the Netherlands

References

External links
 The German-Dutch Communist Left – Philippe Bourrinet

Communist parties in Bulgaria
Defunct political parties in Bulgaria
Political parties established in 1922
1922 establishments in Bulgaria
Council communism
Left communist organizations
Libertarian socialist parties
Bulgaria